The men's triple jump event  at the 1974 European Athletics Indoor Championships was held on 10 March in Gothenburg.

Results

References

Triple jump at the European Athletics Indoor Championships
Triple